Beilschmiedia is a genus of trees and shrubs in family Lauraceae. Most of its species grow in tropical climates, but a few of them are native to temperate regions, and they are widespread in tropical Asia, Africa, Madagascar, Australia, New Zealand, North America, Central America, the Caribbean, and South America. The best-known species to gardeners in temperate areas are B. berteroana and B. miersii because of their frost tolerance. Seeds of B. bancroftii were used as a source of food by Australian Aborigines. Timbers of some species are very valuable.

Overview

Beilschmiedia is a genus of about 240-250 species, that are trees or shrubs; it has about 80 species in tropical Africa and Madagascar. They are commonly canopy trees, growing at altitudes from near sea level to 2200 m. The trees grow in well-developed rainforests, and in warm or temperate forests on poorer sedimentary soils. Most species grow in tropical climates, but a few of them are native to temperate regions. They are widespread in tropical Africa, Asia, Southeast Asia, Australia, New Zealand, Central America, the Caribbean, and South America. The timbers of some species is very valuable.

Ecology
Beilschmiedia falls within the Lauraceae, a family of aromatic evergreen trees or shrubs. Many botanical species are similar in foliage to the Lauraceae due to convergent evolution. Those plants are adapted to high rainfall and humidity. The patterns of speciation in the Lauraceae indicate, since the onset of aridification on the continents 15 million years ago (Mya), rainforest species diversified. One of the products of aridification is the isolation of populations and this likely caused the increase in the rate of speciation as found in the Lauraceae. This genus has species adapted to the laurel forest habitat, so common in the Lauraceae and species adapted to a more Mediterranean-type climate with a dry season with lower rainfall. The morphology of sclerophyllous species is divergent from other humid tropical climate species of the genus. The greatest diversity of species and a greater presence of the genus is given in cloud forest and tropical rainforest in Asia and Southeast Asia. In Madagascar, the genus Beilschmiedia is particularly important in the island flora, and their species were isolated when the island was separated from the African continent.

The genus Beilschmiedia is present in a greater climatic distribution area than other genera of Lauraceae, Beilschmiedia species grow well in moist, well-drained ground, and tolerate a variety of soil types, and attain a maximum in tropical and wetter areas of distribution, but their pattern of speciation results in some cases from the product of aridification of the habitat. Some Beilschmiedia species are adapted to drier conditions than the typical Lauraceae. Some endangered relict species are living in temperate areas and are distributed in Mediterranean climate, and tropical and subtropical lowland forests and  montane rainforest.

Shade-loving B. mannii grows in riverine and swamp forest, or in evergreen primary and secondary forest. B. gaboonensis, B. lebrunii, and B. nitida are included in subgenus Hufelandia of Beilschmiedia. B. variabilis and B. zenkeri are included in section Acrothecon.

Beilschmiedia gaboonensis is a medium-sized tree up to 30 m tall with a bole diameter up to 60 cm. It is distributed from Nigeria to DR Congo and occurs in wet and marshy locations in lowland rainforest. B. lebrunii is a rare tree up to 15 m tall with a bole diameter up to 30 cm, occurring in DR Congo in forest at 1450–1700 m altitude. B. nitida is a shrub or small tree up to 8 m tall, distributed in Cameroon and Congo.

Beilschmiedia variabilis is a shrub or small tree up to 10 m tall with a bole diameter up to 25 cm, occurring rather commonly in Congo in the understorey of forest in swampy, periodically inundated or drier locations. B. zenkeri is a shrub or small tree up to 15 m tall, occurring in Cameroon and Congo in swampy and periodically inundated forest.

The genus Beilschmiedia responded to favourable climatic periods and expanded across the available habitat, adapting also to more extreme conditions, but depending on favorable soil edaphic conditions. Beilschmiedia species need an annual oscillation of the temperature moderated by the proximity of the ocean and many species resist bad cold and frost.
 
A related vegetal community evolved millions of years ago on the supercontinent of Gondwana, and species of this community are now found on several separate areas of the Southern Hemisphere, including South America, Africa, New Zealand, Australia, and New Caledonia. These lauroid-leaved plant communities are twofold to tropical climate and temperate climate, having the more temperate climate their origin in the named Antarctic flora.

The genus Beilschmiedia is present in Mexico, Venezuela, southern Chile, and Argentina from the Pacific Ocean to the Andes between 38° and 45° latitude, where rainfall is abundant, from 1500 to 2500 mm according to locality, distributed throughout the year, but with some subhumid Mediterranean climate influence for three to fourr months in summer. The temperatures are unchanging enough and mild, with no month falling below 5 °C, and the warmest month below 22 °C. Also, they are present in the eastern end of Malesia, including New Guinea, that also has many additional elements of the Antarctic flora, including southern beech (Nothofagus) and eucalypts.

The highlands of New Guinea and New Britain were linked to Australia around 40 Mya, the Indo-Australian tectonic plate began to split apart from the ancient supercontinent Gondwana. 
The laurifolia appears in Cape York Peninsula, mountains  of the coastal strip of New South Wales in Australia, New Guinea, New Caledonia, Tasmania, and New Zealand. This laurel forests are home to species related to those in the Valdivian laurel forests, including southern beech (Nothofagus) through the connection of the Antarctic flora.

Description

Frequently, their bark is pale to dark brown, smooth or coarse, and they have fine, reddish-brown hairs densely covering the branchlets, and the young leaves are reddish. The dark green leaves are alternate and leathery. Sometimes broad, others small and narrow, the leaves have distinctive depressed veins. The flowers are greenish to  cream to yellow-green, and  pedicellate of 4–6 mm. The flowers often are clothed in dense reddish-brown hairs. The flowers are hermaphroditic and arranged in inflorescences. The inflorescence is an erect panicle arising from the leaf axil. The stamens are in two whorls; the ovary is in a superior position.

The fruit is variable from one species to other' in some species it is a drupe, large and globose green, 12 cm in diameter with a tip at the apex. In other species, the fruit is an erect, plum-like, dark purple or sometimes  elliptical to ovoid drupe, dark purple when ripe, and covered in a waxy bloom. In others, the fruit is a black, round drupe with a glaucous bloom, with a single seed inside. In the genus Beilschmiedia, the dispersal of seeds is by birds that swallow them, so they are shaped to attract the birds. The one-seeded fruits are an important food source for birds, including being a favorite food of the native pigeons in New Zealand.

Species
The type species is Beilschmiedia roxburghiana: with native range from the Himalayas to S. China, Indo-China to Peninsula Malaysia. Three Beilschmiedia species are endemic to New Zealand. Beilschmiedia tarairi (taraire) is a common canopy tree in the lowland forests of the North Island. The others are the common canopy tree tawa, (B. tawa), which has thin, willow-like leaves, and the tawaroa (B. tawaroa), which is similar to tawa, but has broader leaves. The New Zealand pigeon is the only species which can disperse the large seeds of the taraire, which pass through its gut unharmed.

The Chilean Beilschmiedia miersii and Beilschmiedia berteroana are sclerophyllous endangered trees endemics to central Chile.

The northern belloto (B. miersii) grows in coastal forest, while the southern belloto (B. berteroana) grows in submountain Andean zone of the temperate deciduous forest region of central Chile. Both forest associations are currently represented in the System of Wild Protected Areas by the government of Chile, they are endangered.

It contains at least these species:

 Beilschmiedia aborensis Kosterm.
 Beilschmiedia acuta Kosterm
 Beilschmiedia acutifolia Teschner
 Beilschmiedia alata Robyns & R.Wilczek
 Beilschmiedia alloiophylla (Rusby) Kosterm.
 Beilschmiedia ambigua Robyns & R. Wilczek
 Beilschmiedia anay (S.F. Blake) Kosterm.
 Beilschmiedia andamanensis M.Gangop.
 Beilschmiedia angustielliptica Lorea-Hern.
 Beilschmiedia angustifolia Kosterm.
 Beilschmiedia appendiculata S. Lee et Y. T. Wei
 B. assamica (Syn.: B. praecox)
 Beilschmiedia bancroftii, (yellow walnut, wanga)
 Beilschmiedia baotingensis S. Lee et Y. T. Wei
 Beilschmiedia berteroana (Gay) Kosterm., (southern belloto)
 Beilschmiedia borneensis Merr
 Beilschmiedia brachythyrsa H.W. Li
 Beilschmiedia bracteata Robyns & R. Wilczek
 Beilschmiedia brenesii C.K. Allen
 Beilschmiedia brevipaniculata Allen
 Beilschmiedia brevipes Ridley
 Beilschmiedia bullata
 Beilschmiedia castrisinensis
 Beilschmiedia costaricensis Mez & Pittier
 Beilschmiedia curviramea (Meisn.) Kosterm.
 Beilschmiedia cylindrica
 Beilschmiedia delicata S．Lee ＆ Y．T．Wei
 Beilschmiedia dictyoneura
 Beilschmiedia elliptica
 Beilschmiedia emarginata
 Beilschmiedia erythrophloia, (Hayata)
 Beilschmiedia fasciata H. W. Li
 Beilschmiedia fordii Dunn
 Beilschmiedia fluminensis Kosterm.
 Beilschmiedia furfuracea Chun et H. T. Chang
 Beilschmiedia gaboonensis
 Beilschmiedia gammieana
 Beilschmiedia gemmiflora Kosterm.
 Beilschmiedia giorgii Robyns & R. Wilczek
 Beilschmiedia glauca
 Beilschmiedia hondurensis Kosterm.
 Beilschmiedia immersinervis Sa. Nishida
 Beilschmiedia insignis Gamble
 Beilschmiedia intermedia
 Beilschmiedia javanica Miq
 Beilschmiedia kunstleri Gamble
 Beilschmiedia kweo (Mildbr.) Robyns & Wilczek
 Beilschmiedia laevis
 Beilschmiedia laotica Kosterm.
 Beilschmiedia letouzeyi
 Beilschmiedia linocieroides
 Beilschmiedia longipetiolata
 Beilschmiedia lucidula (Miq.) Kosterm.
 Beilschmiedia lumutensis Gamble
 Beilschmiedia macropoda
 Beilschmiedia malaccensis
 Beilschmiedia madagascariensis
 Beilschmiedia madang Blume, (Indonesia)
 Beilschmiedia maingayi Hook.f.
 Beilschmiedia manantlanensis Cuevas & Cochrane
 Beilschmiedia mannii (Meisn.) Benth. & Hook.f. ex B.D.Jacks.
 Beilschmiedia mayumbensis Robyns & R. Wilczek
 Beilschmiedia membranacea Gamble
 Beilschmiedia mexicana
 Beilschmiedia micrantha Merr.
 Beilschmiedia micranthopsis Kosterm.
 Beilschmiedia miersii (Gay) Kosterm., (Northern belloto)
 Beilschmiedia muricata H. T. Chang
 Beilschmiedia obconica
 Beilschmiedia obscurinervia H. T. Chang
 Beilschmiedia obtusifolia (Meisn.) F.Muell., blush-walnut, hard bolly-gum
 Beilschmiedia oligandra
 Beilschmiedia ovalioides Sachiko Nishida
 Beilschmiedia ovalis (S.F. Blake) C.K. Allen
 Beilschmiedia pahangensis Gamble
 Beilschmiedia pauciflora
 Beilschmiedia penangiana Gamble
 Beilschmiedia pendula (Sw.) Hemsl.
 Beilschmiedia peninsularis
 Beilschmiedia percoriacea Allen
 Beilschmiedia pergamentacea Allen
 Beilschmiedia preussii Engler
 Beilschmiedia punctilimba H.W. Li
 Beilschmiedia rigida (Mez) Kosterm.
 Beilschmiedia robertsonii Gamble
 Beilschmiedia robusta C.K.Allen
 Beilschmiedia roxburghiana Nees, 1831 (type species)
 Beilschmiedia rufohirtella H.W. Li
 Beilschmiedia sichourensis
 Beilschmiedia sikkimensis
 Beilschmiedia sulcata (Ruiz & Pav.) Kosterm.
 Beilschmiedia tarairi A.Cunn., (taraire)
 Beilschmiedia tawa (A.Cunn.) Kirk, tawa
 Beilschmiedia tawaroa, tawaroa
 Beilschmiedia tilaranensis Sa. Nishida
 Beilschmiedia tooram
 Beilschmiedia tovarensis (Meisn.) Sa. Nishida
 Beilschmiedia tsangii Merr.
 Beilschmiedia tungfangensis
 Beilschmiedia ugandensis Rendle
 Beilschmiedia undulata
 Beilschmiedia velutina
 Beilschmiedia vermoesenii Robyns & R. Wilczek
 Beilschmiedia wangii Allen
 Beilschmiedia wightii
 Beilschmiedia yaanica
 Beilschmiedia yunnanensis Hu
 Beilschmiedia zapoteoides
 Beilschmiedia zeylanica Trimen

References

External links

Beilschmiedia: information from Hebe Society New Zealand
Beilschmiedia: information from Encyclopedia of Chilean Flora
Commercial timbers: Beilschmiedia 

 
Lauraceae genera
Taxonomy articles created by Polbot
Pantropical flora